The Old Paths Radio Network is a radio network broadcasting a full-service Christian radio format in North Carolina, United States. The network is owned by Church Planters of America and operates from three transmitters licensed to Madison, Mayodan and Pilot Mountain.

History

The first station in the network, WGHW near Wilmington, was established in 2006. The station was sold in 2019 to Peace Baptist Church of Wilmington.

CPA also owned stations in the Midwest, which were sold off or deleted. KAJF in Ipswich, South Dakota was sold to Agnus Dei Communications in 2011 and is now KSJP. The license for CPA-owned KWOP at Fort Dodge, Iowa, was canceled in 2016 for being off the air for more than a year.

In 2017, Church Planters sold WWFJ near Fayetteville to the Fundamental Broadcasting Network for $55,800.

Transmitters

References

2006 establishments in North Carolina
Radio stations established in 2006
Christian radio stations in North Carolina
American radio networks